Michael Dillon (1915–1962) was a British physician and the first trans man to undergo phalloplasty.

Michael Dillon may also refer to:
Michael James Robert Dillon, 12th Earl of Roscommon
Michael Dillon (I.R.S. revenue officer) or Michael Dillan (died 1983), first I.R.S. revenue officer to be killed confronting a tax protester
Mike Dillon (racing driver) (born 1965), driver on the NASCAR circuit
Mike Dillon (musician), percussionist/vibraphonist, member of Critters Buggin and Les Claypool's Fancy Band 
Mike Dillon (footballer) (born 1952), English footballer
Michael O. Dillon  (born 1947), American botanist
Michael A. Dillon (1839–1904), American soldier who fought in the American Civil War